Cooperconcha centralis is a species of air-breathing land snail, a pulmonate gastropod mollusk in the family Camaenidae.

Distribution
This species is endemic to Australia.

References

Gastropods of Australia
Cooperconcha
Gastropods described in 1992
Taxonomy articles created by Polbot